Campobello Island (also ) is the largest and only inhabited island in Campobello, a civil parish in southwestern New Brunswick, Canada, near the border with Maine, United States. The island's permanent population in 2021 was 949. It is the site of the Roosevelt Campobello International Park and of Herring Cove Provincial Park.

It has been governed as an incorporated rural community since 2010 but still receives some local service district (LSD) services from the province, being assessed for fire protection, policing, dog control, and general government, and is a member of the Southwest New Brunswick Service Commission (SNBSC). Despite the name, the rural community also includes all other islands in the parish.

The island is part of Charlotte County, which was formed in 1784 when New Brunswick was partitioned from Nova Scotia.

Origin of name 
In 1770, the entire island was granted to Capt. William Owen, who understated the size of the island to circumvent the size limit on land grants at the time. Owen renamed the island Campobello in punning honour of Lord William Campbell, who was Governor of Nova Scotia at the time. Campobello Parish later took its name from the island.

History 

The island was originally settled by the Passamaquoddy Nation, who called it Ebaghuit.

The first Europeans were from the French expedition of Pierre Dugua de Mons and Samuel de Champlain, who founded the nearby Saint Croix Island settlement in 1604. France named the island Port aux Coquilles ("Seashell Harbour").

Following the War of the Spanish Succession, under terms of the Treaty of Utrecht (1713), the island became part of the British colony of Nova Scotia.

The population was increased by United Empire Loyalists after the American Revolutionary War. Smuggling was a major part of the island's prosperity around this time. During the War of 1812 the Royal Navy seized coastal lands of Maine as far south as the Penobscot River but returned them following the war, except for offshore islands. In 1817, the United States relinquished its claim to Campobello, Deer, and Grand Manan islands, in exchange for islands in Cobscook Bay.

In 1866, a band of more than 700 members of the Fenian Brotherhood arrived at the Maine shore opposite the island with the intention of seizing Campobello but were dispersed by British warships from Halifax.

 
British naval officer John James Robinson became owner of the island in 1857. In 1881, it was sold to a group of American businessmen, including James Roosevelt. In the 1880s the island was developed as a resort summer colony for wealthy Canadians and Americans, as was nearby St. Andrews, New Brunswick and Bar Harbor, Maine. A luxurious resort hotel and many grand estates were built. From 1883, the Roosevelt family made Campobello Island their summer home.

By the mid-1800s, Campobello Island had a population in excess of 1,000, which grew to 1,230 by 1910.

Campobello Parish 
In 1803, Campobello Island "with its appurtenances" was separated from West Isles Parish to establish Campo-Bello Parish. The boundary description was clarified in 1877 as "[b]eing the Island so named, and other Islands to the south and east of Head Harbour passage, but west of Grand Manan."

The name appeared in government acts as Campo Bello in 1850, 1854, 1877, and 1896, finally appearing as Campobello in 1903.

The local service district of the parish of Campobello was established in 1969 to assess for community services, in this case to contract with an independent agency in Lubec, Maine, to provide ambulance conveyance from Campobello to St. Stephen Hospital. Fire protection was added later in 1969 first aid & ambulance services in 1984, and recreational facilities in 1998.

The entire parish was incorporated as the Rural Community of Campobello Island in November 2010 and the LSD dissolved. The civil parish continues to exist.

Geography 
The island is at the entrance to Passamaquoddy Bay, adjacent to the entrance to Cobscook Bay, and within the Bay of Fundy. The island is one of the Fundy Islands. The island has no road connection to the rest of Canada; it is connected by the Franklin Delano Roosevelt Bridge to nearby Lubec, Maine. Reaching mainland Canada by car without crossing an international border is possible only during the summer season and requires two separate ferry trips, first to nearby Deer Island, then to L'Etete.

The ferry to Deer Island was stopped in 2017 after the boat sank, leaving the island without a direct connection to the rest of Canada. Service was restored and became year-round due to the COVID pandemic.

The jurisdiction of the eponymous rural community and of the census division include Head Harbour Island.

On the north is a high bluff headland, East Quoddy Point. On the west are Charley Point and the Mulholland Point navigation light.

Economy 
The island has several good harbours, and the majority of residents are employed in the fishing, aquaculture or tourism industries.

The two major tourist attractions on the island are Herring Cove Provincial Park and Roosevelt Campobello International Park. The latter was created in 1964 and was officially opened by U.S. President Lyndon Johnson and Canadian Prime Minister Lester Pearson in 1966.

Infrastructure 
The island's only highway, Route 774, is connected by the Franklin Delano Roosevelt Bridge to Lubec, Maine – the easternmost town in the continental United States. The only transportation link with the rest of Canada is a seasonal ferry service to Deer Island Point, New Brunswick, on Deer Island.

Mail delivered to the community goes through the United States. The United States Customs and Border Protection service began searching packages to/from the island in 2019, prompting outcry from residents, and debates in the House of Commons of Canada, due to privacy and sovereignty concerns.

In late 2020, residents renewed their demands for the Canadian government to build a bridge to the New Brunswick mainland because the current ferry boat cannot operate in winter. (Three other New Brunswick islands do benefit from year-round ferry service.) Driving to other points in Canada required travel into Maine via the bridge, difficult during the restrictions imposed on both sides of the border during the COVID-19 pandemic in North America. The border closure was particularly problematic, since it prohibited driving to and from the island, except for essential purposes.

The government agreed to pay for an extension of the ferry service until 10 January 2021 but, afterwards, winter weather would make sailing the small ferry too dangerous. Islanders interviewed by the Toronto Star said that the restrictions were also causing serious problems for services attempting to reach the island, but insisted that the need for a bridge, or year-round ferry service, was long-standing and not just relevant during the pandemic. One of the residents made this comment: "You have to live there to see how bad it is when you don't have a road to your own country". In an interview, Member of Parliament for the region, John Williamson, made no promises but offered a glimmer of hope: "I think we’re in a position that some infrastructure dollars could be made available once the province has a plan and proposal ready to submit".

Education 

The island has one school, Campobello Island Consolidated School, for all school grades, in the Anglophone South School District.

Communities 
Communities within the rural community.
 North Road
 Otter Cove
 Welshpool
 Wilsons Beach

Bodies of water 
Bodies of water at least partly within the rural community.

 Friars Bay
 Lake Glensevern
 Harbour de Lute
 Head Harbour
 Head Harbour Passage
 Lubec Channel
 Lubec Narrows
 Mill Cove Creek
 Mill Stream
 Quoddy Narrows
 Passamaquoddy Bay

Other islands 
Other named islands within the rural community.
 Duck Islands
 Duck Rock
 Head Harbour Island
 Little Island
 Sugar Loaf Rock

Conservation areas 
Conservation areas at least partly within the rural community.
 Herring Cove Provincial Park
 Roosevelt Campobello International Park

Demographics 

Language

See also 
 List of communities in New Brunswick
 List of islands of New Brunswick

Notes

References

External links 

Communities in Charlotte County, New Brunswick
Former local service districts of New Brunswick
Coastal islands of New Brunswick
Rural communities in New Brunswick